Caloptilia tangkai is a moth of the family Gracillariidae. It is found in Thailand.

References

tangkai
Moths of Asia
Moths described in 1993